The 1987 Jacksonville State Gamecocks football team represented Jacksonville State University as a member of the Gulf South Conference (GSC) during the 1987 NCAA Division II football season. Led by third-year head coach Bill Burgess, the Gamecocks compiled an overall record of 5–4–1 with a mark of 3–4–1 in conference play, and finished tied for fifth in the GSC.

Schedule

References

Jacksonville State
Jacksonville State Gamecocks football seasons
Jacksonville State Gamecocks football